The Modeling and Simulation Coordination Office (M&SCO) is an organization within the United States Department of Defense that provides modeling and simulation technology. The M&SCO was named the Defense Modeling and Simulation Office (DMSO) when it was created by Congress in 2006. It was renamed the Modeling and Simulation Coordination Office in late 2007.

The M&SCO leads DoD modeling and simulation standardization efforts. It is the DoD point of contact for coordinating modeling and simulation activities with NATO and Partnership for Peace (PfP) organizations, and provides support to the DoD modeling and simulation management system.

External links
 

United States Department of Defense agencies
Military simulation